Gidan Madi is a city in sokoto state and the head quarter of  Tangaza Local Government Area in Sokoto State, Nigeria, close to the  town of Sutti.

It is the headquarters of the LGA, and the Post Office of the LGA  is also located there.

References

Populated places in Sokoto State